Chotelal Verma is an Indian politician and a member of the 18th Uttar Pradesh Assembly and also Sixteenth Legislative Assembly of Uttar Pradesh in India. He represents the Fatehabad constituency of Uttar Pradesh and is a member of the Bharatiya Janata Party, having previously been a member of the Bahujan Samaj Party until 2016.

Early life and  education
Chotelal Verma was born in the Village Nagla Devhans of Agra district. He attended the "Janta Intermediate college" and is educated till twelfth grade.

Political career
Chotelal Verma has been a MLA for three terms. He represented the Fatehabad constituency and was a member of the Bahujan Samaj Party political party. Verma was earlier a member of the Bharatiya Janata Party, and rejoined the BJP on 27 December 2016.

Posts held

Assets & Liabilities

See also

 Fatehabad (Assembly constituency)
 Sixteenth Legislative Assembly of Uttar Pradesh
 Uttar Pradesh Legislative Assembly

References 

Bahujan Samaj Party politicians from Uttar Pradesh
Uttar Pradesh MLAs 1997–2002
Uttar Pradesh MLAs 2002–2007
Uttar Pradesh MLAs 2012–2017
People from Agra district
1953 births
Living people
Bharatiya Janata Party politicians from Uttar Pradesh
Uttar Pradesh MLAs 2022–2027